Banwy is a community in northwest Montgomeryshire, Powys, Wales, named after the River Banwy and also called Banw in Welsh.

The community with the villages of Llangadfan and Foel, also called Garthbeibio. It is a sparsely populated area centred on the village of Llangadfan and extending west for some 10 km to the boundary with Gwynedd. It is located along the upper River Banwy valley, on either side of the A458 road between Llanfair Caereinion and Mallwyd.

The population according to the 2011 UK census was 605. In 2005, the population was 534.

Abernodwydd Farmhouse, a wooden-framed farmhouse built in 1678 from the Llangadfan was reassembled at the St Fagans National Museum of History. Banwy was the site of Ffridd y Castell, or Ffriddycastell.

References

External links

Montgomeryshire
Communities in Powys